Insigniocastnia is a genus of moths within the family Castniidae containing only one species, Insigniocastnia taisae, which is found in Ecuador.

The length of the forewings is 17.5-24.3 mm.

References

Castniidae
Monotypic moth genera
Moths of South America